Pedro Alexander Florimón Jr. (born December 10, 1986), is a Dominican professional baseball shortstop who is a free agent. He has played in Major League Baseball (MLB) for the Baltimore Orioles, Minnesota Twins, Pittsburgh Pirates, and Philadelphia Phillies. In , Florimón was signed by the Orioles, as a non-drafted free agent.

Personal life
Florimón was born in La Romana, Dominican Republic, which he described as a "medium-sized" town. His favorite Major League Baseball player is Omar Vizquel.

Professional baseball career

Baltimore Orioles
Florimón was signed by the Orioles as a non-drafted free agent on June 18, 2004. He played in the Dominican Summer League in 2004 and 2005.

In 2006, he played for the rookie-level Bluefield Orioles, and the Class-A Short-Season Aberdeen IronBirds. With Bluefield, he batted .333 with 23 runs, 40 hits, 6 doubles, 1 triple, 1 home run, 8 RBIs, and 7 stolen bases in 33 games. He led the Bluefields in stolen bases and caught stealing (6); and was second in bases on balls (28) and batting average. With the IronBirds, he batted .248 with 13 runs, 26 hits, 4 doubles, 1 triple, and 5 RBIs in 26 games. In 2007, he spent the entire season with the Class-A Delmarva Shorebirds and batted .197 with 50 runs, 73 hits, 14 doubles, 1 triple, 4 home runs, 34 RBIs, and 16 stolen bases in 111 games.

The next season, Florimón again played for the Class-A Delmarva Shorebirds. In 81 games, he batted .223 with 28 runs, 60 hits, 18 doubles, 1 triple, 19 RBIs, and 13 stolen bases. In 2009, he spent most of the season with the Class-A Advanced Frederick Keys of the Carolina League; however, he spent some of the season with the Double-A Bowie Baysox of the Eastern League. With the Keys, he batted .267 with 76 runs, 115 hits, 32 doubles, 5 triples, 9 home runs, 68 RBIs, and 26 stolen bases in 115 games. On the team, he was first in triples; second in runs, stolen bases, and caught stealing (9); and was third in RBIs, and bases on balls (42). Florimón was selected to the Carolina League mid-season All-Star game. He was also named the Carolina League's Player of the Week for the week of August 17–23. Florimón played 7 games with the Baysox, and batted .091 with 2 hits, and 1 RBI. On November 19, Florimón was placed on the Orioles 40-man roster after his contract was purchased from Bowie. He was re-signed by the Orioles on March 9.

Florimón spent spring training with the Orioles until March 26, when he was assigned to Double-A Bowie.

Florimón started the 2010 season with Bowie. On May 26, he was placed on the seven-day disabled list. He made his major league debut with the Orioles on September 10.

Minnesota Twins
On December 5, 2011, he was claimed off waivers by the Minnesota Twins. In 2012, Florimón played in 43 games for the Twins, amassing 137 at bats. He hit .219 with one home run and 10 RBIs.

The next season, Florimón competed for the starting shortstop position, which he won by default. In 2012, in 137 at bats he batted .219/.272/.307.

Florimón opened the 2013 season as the starting shortstop for the Twins. Despite his strong defensive play at shortstop, Florimón struggled mightily at the plate. In 443 at bats, he hit .221 with 9 home runs, stole 15 bases in 21 attempts, and walked 33 times while striking out 115 times.

For the 2014 season, Florimón was anointed the starting shortstop once again, but lasted just 33 games before being demoted the Rochester Red Wings of the Class AAA International League. During his brief stint at the beginning of the season, Florimón hit under the Mendoza line (.092) as he collected just 7 hits in his 76 at bats for Minnesota. He finished the season with Rochester without receiving a September call-up.

Pittsburgh Pirates
On September 18, 2014, the Washington Nationals claimed Florimón from the Twins off of waivers. On November 20, the Pittsburgh Pirates claimed Florimón from the Nationals off of waivers.

He was designated for assignment on April 5, 2015. On April 11, he was outrighted to the Indianapolis Indians. On July 22, he was called up and made his season debut as the starting shortstop. Three days later on July 25, he switched his uniform number from 17 to 23 to accommodate the newly acquired Aramis Ramírez so Ramirez could wear number 17 since his longtime uniform number 16 was already being worn by first base coach Nick Leyva. On August 18, Florimon hit a walk-off triple against the Diamondbacks to give Bucs a 9–8 win in the 15th. The 2015 Season saw Florimon wear 3 different uniform numbers: 17 (July 22 – July 24), 23 (July 25 – August 19) and 51 (September 2 -End of the Season).

He was outrighted on November 2, 2016, and elected free agency.

Philadelphia Phillies
In December 2016, Florimón signed a minor league contract with the Philadelphia Phillies. He was called up by the Phillies on August 17, 2017, making his Phillies debut in the outfield. He suffered a broken ankle September 2 versus the Marlins after rolling and dislocating his right ankle while crossing first base legging out an infield single. For the season, in 46 at bats he batted .348/.388/.478. Florimon signed a minor league contract with the Phillies on November 13.

Florimon began the 2018 season playing for the Phillies, but on May 29 he fouled a ball off his right foot and broke it, and was put on the disabled list. He was batting .263/.323/.491 in 57 at bats at the time, and had played for the Phillies at shortstop, pitcher, right field, center field, and third base. For the season, he batted .225/.276/.423, with 2 home runs and 5 RBIs in 71 at bats.

Atlanta Braves
On November 26, 2018, Florimón signed a minor-league deal with the Atlanta Braves with an invitation to spring training. He elected free agency on November 4, 2019.

San Diego Padres
On January 18, 2021, Florimón signed a minor league contract with the San Diego Padres organization. He elected free agency on November 7, 2021.

Algodoneros de Unión Laguna
On April 13, 2022, Florimón signed with the Algodoneros de Unión Laguna of the Mexican League. In 14 games, he hit .292/.433/.313 with 14 hits and 3 RBIs. Florimón was released on May 10, 2022.

Scouting report 
Scout.com opined that Florimón has trouble hitting a breaking ball, and that he often looks "lost at the plate." However, they also stated that he has "impressive plate discipline, if all he is seeing are fastballs." The site also described him as a "plus runner."

References

External links

1986 births
Living people
Aberdeen IronBirds players
Baltimore Orioles players
Bluefield Orioles players
Bowie Baysox players
Delmarva Shorebirds players
Dominican Republic expatriate baseball players in the United States
El Paso Chihuahuas players
Estrellas Orientales players
Frederick Keys players
Gwinnett Stripers players
Indianapolis Indians players
Lehigh Valley IronPigs players
Leones del Escogido players
Major League Baseball players from the Dominican Republic
Major League Baseball second basemen
Major League Baseball shortstops
Major League Baseball third basemen
Major League Baseball outfielders
Minnesota Twins players
New Britain Rock Cats players
People from La Romana, Dominican Republic
Philadelphia Phillies players
Pittsburgh Pirates players
Rochester Red Wings players
Clearwater Threshers players
Reading Fightin Phils players
Toros del Este players